Mariscal Sucre International Airport  was the main international airport serving Quito, Pichincha Province, Ecuador. It was the busiest airport in Ecuador by passenger traffic, by aircraft movement and by cargo movement, and one of the busiest airports in South America. It was named after Venezuelan-born Antonio José de Sucre, a hero of Ecuadorian and Latin American independence. It began operations in 1960, and during its last years of operation, handled about 6.2 million passengers and 164,000 metric tons of freight per year. The airport, one of the highest in the world (at  AMSL) was located in the northern part of the city, in the Chaupicruz parish, within five minutes of Quito's financial center; the terminals were located at the intersection of Amazonas and La Prensa avenues. Mariscal Sucre International was the largest hub for TAME with an average of 50 daily departures.

The old Mariscal Sucre International Airport ceased all operations at 19:00 on February 19, 2013, following the departure of TAME flight 321 to Guayaquil (scheduled for 18:55). Iberia operated the final international departure from the airport. On the morning of February 20, 2013, all operations moved to the new airport of the same name. The first domestic flights scheduled to arrive at the new airport were TAME Flight 302 originating in Guayaquil, and LAN Flight 2590 originating in Lima, Peru. It was constructed by a private consortium.

The former airport is now the site of Parque Bicentenario, the biggest urban park in Quito.

Due to its location in the middle of a city surrounded by mountains, the old airport could no longer be expanded to accommodate any larger aircraft or an increase in air traffic. Its operation posed risks; several serious accidents and incidents had occurred in years prior to its closure.

History
Mariscal Sucre International Airport was inaugurated in 1960, the main terminal was designed during the government of President Velasco Ibarra. The present terminal and concourses (A, B and C) were refurbished in 2003, consisting of several taxiways, maintenance platforms, parking areas, a cellar, passenger halls, mezzanine areas and other amenities. Terminal B consisted of two floors; the lower level held the departures area with executive waiting rooms and restaurants, and the upper level consisted of airline and airport offices.

The airport had ten gates, five with Jet bridges and five with stairs.

TAME's main hub
On 10 December 2000, TAME officially opened its hub in Quito, offering an estimated 2,000 possible connections per week, including greater numbers of frequencies, schedules and destinations served. Connections between domestic and international destinations were operated directly and through code sharing agreements with airlines such as TACA Airlines and Copa Airlines.

Operations out of Quito allowed travelers to connect between domestic destinations (such as Guayaquil to Galápagos), from a domestic destination to an international destination (Such as Tena to Cali), from an international destination to a domestic city (Such as Cali to Tulcán), between two international destinations (Such as Bogota to Panama City) and allows for simpler codeshare connections (such as Lima to Santa Rosa with TACA Airlines and TAME).

The hub also featured facilities for easier transits, such as exclusive check-in counters for travelers in transit, buses for internal transportation between Terminals A & B, and two special lounges for national and international transit passengers to avoid having to go through Ecuadorian customs and immigration between transits.

TAME's hub transferred to Mariscal Sucre International Airport in Tababela on February 19, 2013.

Facilities
The airport consisted of one terminal split into a national and international areas. It was equipped with five swing gates capable of directing arriving passengers to either Immigration or to baggage claim. In addition, there were numerous ground slots where passengers walked to the aircraft from the terminal.

Passenger services

VIP lounges
Mariscal Sucre Airport had 4 VIP Salons in the terminals A and B. For passengers of AeroGal, there was an exclusive salon near gate 2,"AeroGal VIP Club". Passengers of TAME had access to the "TAME" VIP Lounge in terminal B, a lounge that was exclusively for first and business class passengers. This area was nominated as the best VIP lounge of the year in Ecuador, the "QUIPORT VIP Club", and a lesser VIP Lounge, the "American Airlines Admirals Club" in the gate 10.

Transportation
Transportation between the airport and city was provided by taxis, tour buses and vans. For security reasons, visitors were recommended to take only those taxis offered by registered companies at the airport Terminal A arrivals area.

Former terminals, airlines and destinations
The airlines listed in bold are currently in operation and serve the new Quito airport while the airlines listed in italics are also in operation but no longer serve Quito.

Domestic Passenger Terminal
This terminal served national arrivals and departures, the airlines that served here were:

International Passenger Terminal
This terminal served international arrivals and departures, the airlines, defunct or still operating, were:

Cargo airlines and destinations
These destinations were operated from the Cargo Terminal.

Accidents and incidents
29 November 2012: A Boeing 737-800 of Copa Airlines went off the runway during landing, leaving the main landing gear about 3 feet from the concrete. There were no injuries and the accident was caused by heavy rain falling at the time.
16 September 2011: TAME flight 148 from Loja, 97 passengers & 6 crew, slipped off the runway at 19:11. A government official said some passengers suffered "light contusions", but none perished. Airport operations were halted for 3.5 hrs.
27 October 2009: An Ecuadorian Air Force HAL Dhruv helicopter crashed during display maneuvers at Mariscal Sucre International Airport, with both pilots sustaining only minor scratches and no casualties. The aircraft was flying in military formation with two other helicopters.
19 March 2009: An Ecuadorian Air Force Beechcraft B200 King Air struck a building in the Guápulo district of Quito while on approach to Mariscal Sucre International Airport in heavy fog. All five occupants of the aircraft were killed, as well as two people on the ground.
23 September 2008: An Icaro Air Fokker F28 Mk4000 skidded off the runway. There were no injuries among the 62 passengers, but the aircraft was written off.
9 November 2007: An Iberia Airlines Airbus A340-600 operating Iberia Airlines Flight 6463 was badly damaged after sliding off the runway. The landing gear collapsed and two engines were dislodged. All 333 passengers and crew were evacuated via inflatable slides, but no serious injuries were reported.
20 April 2005: Angry protesters breached the airport perimeter with vehicles and blocked the runway, resulting in the closure of the airport for several hours. This occurred as deposed President Lucio Gutiérrez attempted to flee the capital in an Ecuadorian Army Super King Air, shortly after being ousted by a popular revolt that same day, which forced him to leave Carondelet Palace (and later being finally removed by the Congress). The protester's assault forced the pilots to abort takeoff, after which Gutiérrez boarded an Army helicopter; which had earlier removed him from Carondelet Palace and took him to the airport, and fled to the safe haven of the Brazilian ambassador's residency in Quito before leaving into exile.
17 January 2003: A TAME Fokker F28 Mk4000 ran off the runway after takeoff was aborted due to a tire blowout. The nose gear collapsed, and the aircraft came to rest  past the runway threshold. There were no injuries.
29 August 1998: A Cubana de Aviación Tupolev Tu-154M overshot the runway, killing the 14-member crew, 56 of the 77 passengers and 10 people on the ground.
1 May 1996: A Fly Linhas Aéreas Boeing 727-200 aborted takeoff in rainy weather, but overshot the runway, crossing a road that lay at the end of runway 35. The aircraft was fully loaded. No injuries were reported. on the plane were the players of a Brazilian Corinthians soccer team.
All seven occupants were killed. The flight was carrying an important number of oil executives from Argentina and Chile to a meeting in Quito. Amongst those killed was Argentine YPF's CEO and president José Estenssoro, who had led privatization efforts under Carlos Menem; Juan Pedrals Gili, the Spanish-born general manager of Chilean ENAP as well as Manfred Hecht Mittersteiner, chief of production at ENAP's international subsidiary Sipetrol.
The aircraft crashed into a residential area, killing all 10 on board and 3 on the ground.
3 June 1988: an Ecuadorian Air Force North American Sabreliner NA265-40A crashed in Quito, killing all 11 people on board including the commander of the Ecuadorian Air Force, and a high-ranking officer of Israeli Air Force
18 September 1984: An AECA (Aeroservicios Ecuatorianos) Douglas DC-8-50 freighter failed to achieve altitude during takeoff, running off the end of the runway and crashing into a residential area  past the runway, destroying 25 houses, killing all 4 crewmembers and 49 people on the ground.
29 April 1982: A Lockheed C-130 Hercules operated by the Ecuadorian Air Force crashed into a mountain near Quito while executing a missed approach; 7 were killed.
27 January 1980: An Avianca Boeing 727 landed too fast, too far down the runway, and consequently overran, collapsing the nosegear. No injuries were reported.

References

External links

CORPAQ – Corporación Aeropuerto de Quito  

Marsical Sucre Old International Airport
Defunct airports in Ecuador
Buildings and structures in Quito
Airports established in 1960
Airports disestablished in 2013
1960 establishments in Ecuador
2013 disestablishments in Ecuador